Wrong Side of Town is a 2010 American action film written, produced and directed by David DeFalco, scored by Jim Kaufman, and starring Rob Van Dam and Dave Bautista. The film was released direct-to-DVD in the United States on February 23, 2010.

Plot
Bobby Kalinowski, is a former Navy Seal enjoys a peaceful life as a landscape architect in Louisiana with his family. After receiving an invitation from new neighbors Clay Freeman and Elise Freeman, they go out for a night on the town to a famous club. The evening soon takes a turn for the worse when Bobby gets into a conflict with one of the club owners, named Ethan Bordas. In the middle of the conflict, Ethan accidentally falls and is stabbed by his own knife, while fighting with Bobby, who was defending his wife.

Seeking revenge, Ethan's father Seth Bordas, previously thought to be his older brother, puts a $100,000 bounty on Bobby's head. Also making matters difficult, Bobby is unable to receive help from the law, for Seth has Clay Freeman, and a corrupt police sergeant, working for him. Now Bobby must survive and escape Louisiana while being hunted by criminals, corrupt law, and many others in the city. To protect his family and neighbors, Bobby decides to separate himself from them and goes to his Navy Seal colleague Big Ronnie (or known as B.R.) for help. B.R. initially refuses, deciding to take the bounty, but later changes his mind and helps Bobby. Seth targets Bobby’s family and kidnaps his 16-year-old daughter Brianna. However, Bobby ends up fighting and killing Seth and his henchmen with B.R.'s help, and rescues his daughter.

Cast
 Rob Van Dam as Bobby Kalinowski
 Dave Bautista as Big Ronnie (B.R.)
 Lara Grice as Dawn Kalinowski
 Edrick Browne as Clay Freeman
 Ava Santana  as Elise Freeman
 Stormy Daniels as Stormy
 Randal Reeder as Trouble
 Jerry Katz as Seth Bordas
 Louis Herthum as Briggs
 Brooke Frost as Brianna Kalinowski
 Ja Rule a.k.a. Jeffrey Atkins as Razor
 Nelson Frazier, Jr. as Animal
 Damon Lipari as Nicky
 Scott Schwartz as Deacon
 David DeFalco as Demon
 Marrese Crump as Markus
 Omarion a.k.a. Omari Grandberry as Stash
 Quess a.k.a. Brian Wakefield as Dawg
 Ross Britz as Ethan Bordas
 "Big Dog" Ramar Jenkins as Big Dog
 Carsten H.W. Lorenz as Cab Driver
 Anthony M. Frederick as Detective Hernandez
 Gabriela Ostos as Abusive Woman
 J. Omar Castro as Cop

Production
The film is set and filmed at Baton Rouge, Louisiana and Los Angeles, California on January 18 and February 21, 2009.

Home media
On February 23, 2010, DVD was released by Lionsgate in the United States in Region 1. DVD was released in Region 2 in the United Kingdom on 15 March 2010, it was distributed by Entertainment One.

Critical response
R.L. Shaffer of IGN scored the film  2/10, writing "Alas, Wrong Side of Town gets everything wrong. The producers cast a bunch of wrestlers who can't act and they gave them unbelievable dialogue and stupid characters. It's no wonder their performances are terrible. No one is guided in the right direction, and the entire production feels like a high school-produced cheapie that everyone's ashamed they made".

References

External links
 

2010 films
2010 action films
2010 direct-to-video films
American action films
Films scored by Jim Kaufman
Films directed by David DeFalco
Films set in Los Angeles
Films set in Louisiana
Professional wrestling-related mass media
2010s English-language films
2010s American films